Sydney Airport Holdings was a publiclylisted Australian holding company which owned a 100% interest in Kingsford Smith Airport via Sydney Airport Corporation. The company was listed on the Australian Stock Exchange and had its head office located in Sydney, New South Wales.

The company was acquired in March 2022 by Sydney Aviation Alliance (SAA).

History
In 1989, Qantas bought a 30-year lease on the domestic terminal of Sydney Airport, but sold it back to the Airport's operator in August 2015 for US$395 million.

In 2002, the Macquarie Bank bought a 99-year lease on the airport for $5.6 billion.

The company was known as Macquarie Airports as a combination of trusts managed by Macquarie Group until it was spun off in 2009 to form MAp Airports. MAp owned shareholdings in Brussels and Copenhagen Airports, and an 84.8% stake in Sydney Airport.

In 2011, MAp Airports traded its stakes in the Brussels and Copenhagen airports to the Ontario Teachers' Pension Plan in exchange for the OTPP's 11% stake in Sydney airport. In December 2011, MAp Airports renamed itself Sydney Airport Holdings. The company retained a 1% stake in Bristol Airport until 2013.

In 2013, Sydney Airport Holdings took a 100% stake in Sydney Airport by issuing securities to, or buying out, minority owners of the airport, which included various superannuation funds.

In August 2013, it was revealed that, since the airport had been acquired by the Macquarie Bank in 2002, it didn't pay corporate taxes, even though all other airports in the country did. In November 2013, the Macquarie Bank sold its shares of the airport back to its own shareholders, cashing $377 million in the process.

In November 2021, the company announced that it had agreed to accept a $23.6 billion takeover bid from the Sydney Aviation Alliance (SAA), a consortium comprising IFM Investors, QSuper and Global Infrastructure Partners. In December 2021, the Australian Competition & Consumer Commission approved the deal. The acquisition was completed in March 2022.

Sydney Airport Corporation

Sydney Airport Corporation Limited (SACL) is a private company that operates and manages Kingsford Smith Airport.

Southern Cross Airports Corporation Holdings Limited (SCACH) is the ultimate parent company of SACL, which is controlled by a number of entities including Sydney Airport Holdings.

Corporate background
In 2002, the Australian Government entered into an arrangement for SACL to lease and operate the airport for a period of 99 years. Whilst the airport is privately controlled under this agreement, the Australian Government still retains responsibility for other airport-related services through agencies such as Airservices Australia (air traffic control, aviation communications/navigation-aids, airport fire-fighting and rescue), the Australian Customs Service, the Australian Quarantine and Inspection Service, the Australian Federal Police and the Department of Infrastructure and Transport.

Management
The company's inaugural CEO was Max Moore-Wilton , serving from 2002 until April 2006; when Moore-Wilton resigned as CEO to become Chairman of Sydney Airport Holdings. He was succeeded as CEO by former Australian Broadcasting Corporation managing director, Russell Balding. In 2011, Kerrie Mather, a senior executive with MApa trust spun out of the Macquarie Group, succeeded Balding as CEO.

References

External links
 
 Corporate pages

Holding companies of Australia
Transport operators of Australia
Airport operators
Aviation in Australia
Companies based in Sydney
Holding companies established in 2002
Transport companies established in 2002
Australian companies established in 2002
Sydney Airport
Companies listed on the Australian Securities Exchange
2013 mergers and acquisitions
2022 mergers and acquisitions